Meryem Hajri (born 15 September 1994) is a Moroccan footballer who plays as a forward for the Morocco women's national team.

International career
Hajri capped for Morocco at senior level during the 2018 Africa Women Cup of Nations qualification (first round).

See also
List of Morocco women's international footballers

References

External links

1994 births
Living people
Footballers from Casablanca
Moroccan women's footballers
Women's association football forwards
Wydad AC players
Primera División (women) players
Sporting de Huelva players
Morocco women's international footballers
Moroccan expatriate footballers
Moroccan expatriate sportspeople in Spain
Expatriate women's footballers in Spain